Chase County USD 284 is a public unified school district headquartered in Cottonwood Falls, Kansas, United States.  The district includes the communities of Cottonwood Falls, Strong City, Cedar Point, Elmdale, Matfield Green, Bazaar, Clements, Saffordville, Toledo, and nearby rural areas of Chase, Lyon, Morris Counties.  It covers almost all of Chase County.

Schools
The school district operates the following schools:
 Chase County Junior/Senior High School at 600 Main Street in Cottonwood Falls.
 Chase County Elementary School at 410 Palmer Street in Strong City.

See also
 Kansas State Department of Education
 Kansas State High School Activities Association
 List of high schools in Kansas
 List of unified school districts in Kansas

References

External links
 

School districts in Kansas
Education in Chase County, Kansas